Dan Wool is an American composer and sound designer. Originally from St. Louis, Missouri, where he played in the punk rock band The Strikers, he is based in San Francisco, California. He has worked in New York, Los Angeles, London, Mexico City and Anhui China creating scores for broadcast television projects, theatrical sound installations and more than 45 feature films, including nine films for celebrated cult filmmaker Alex Cox. From 2010 to 2021 Wool collaborated with filmmaker, and legendary special effects artist Phil Tippett to create the score for Tippett's epic stop-motion feature film Mad God. Wool has also composed music for television movies and episodic series for ABC, CBS, FOX, NBC, and HBO. He is often recognized for his work as principal composer in film score soundtrack-group Pray for Rain.

Wool has also worked extensively creating sound and music for international and domestic advertising and sound-branding and also as sound-designer for short films and documentaries, including several for the BBC and Channel 4 (UK). As a music producer and engineer Wool has collaborated with international artists such as Bernie Worrell (Parliament-Funkadelic), Philip Chevron and James Fearnley (The Pogues), Debbie Harry (Blondie), and worked with various bay-area recording artists such as All My Pretty Ones, Beth Custer, Enrique, essence (singer), Indianna Hale, The Mermen, Kally Price and Todd Stadtman.

In the Arts, Wool has composed scores and designed sound for The Architecture and Design Museum (A+D Museum), Los Angeles (sound installation for the exhibition "Windshield Perspective" May–July 2013), Choreographer Alice Sheppard, Amy Seiwert's Imagery dance company: Sketch Series (choreographer Marc Brew). AXIS Dance Company, Disability Dance Works, RAWdance, choreographer Sonsherée Giles, The Tea Dancers/Ballet de la Compasión, and seven immersive, multi-channel audio performance installations for Liss Fain Dance. In 2018 his music and sound design work for Phil Tippett and Lucy Raven’s experimental film OUT THERE screened at MoMA (NYC).In October 2010 Wool performed in composer Jem Finer's "Longplayer" installation, sponsored by the Long Now Foundation at YBCA. In the years 2015 through 2018 he has been engaged by the U.S. Olympic Synchronized Swimming Team for ongoing compositional and musical services.

In 2023 Wool was nominated for an Annie Award (International Animation Society Award) for Best Music in an Animated Feature Film for Phil Tippett's Mad God. Wool has twice been nominated for an Isadora Duncan Dance Award (Izzie Award) for Outstanding Achievement in Music/Sound/Text, in 2017 for his work with Liss Fain Dance and in 2013 for his work with AXIS Dance Company. In 2014 Dan received an award from Bay Area Dance Watch (Blessay Award) for “Best Dance Soundtrack”

Dan Wool is the brother of screenwriter/electrician/gardener Abbe Wool and stepbrother to Los Angeles musician Zander Schloss (Circle Jerks, Joe Strummer) and St. Louis luminary Chip Schloss.

Filmography
(feature film composer credits except as indicated)
 Eventos En El Campo (2023) (Short Film) Music and Sound Design
 Phil Tippett's Mad God (2022)
 Inclinations (2019) (Short Film) Music and Sound Design
 Mad God Part 3 (2018) (Short Film)
 OUT THERE (2018) (Short Film) Music and Sound Design
 Tombstone Rashomon (2017)
 Mad God Part 2 (2015) (Short Film)
 Racing to Zero (2014) (Documentary)
 Mad God Part 1 (2014) (Short Film)
 Hog's Tooth (2014) (Short Film)
 The Inheritance (2014) (Short Film)
 The Mayor (2013) (Short Documentary)
 The Caretaker (2012) (Short Documentary)
 The Hack (2011) (Short Film) Sound Design
 Sin Pais (2010) (TV) (Short Documentary)
 Immigration Tango (2010)
 Repo Chick (2010)
 5 Westerns (2008) (TV) (Short Documentary Series) Music and Sound Design
 Dispatches from Nicaragua (2008) (TV) Walker DVD Element
 Searchers 2.0 (2007)
 Journeyman (2006)
 Missing Scenes (2006) Producer, Music and Sound Design for Repo Man Anniversary Edition DVD Element
 Repo Code (2006) Music and Sound Design for Repo Man Anniversary Edition DVD Element
 Harry Zen Stanton (2006) Music and Sound Design for Repo Man Anniversary Edition DVD Element
 Death and the Compass (2005) Commentary for UK DVD
 Dalai Lama: Discourse on the Heart Sutra (2004) (DVD)
 Mike Hama - Private Detective: Mike Hama Must Die! (2002) (TV)
 Never Trust a Serial Killer (2002)
 The Wednesday Woman (2000) (TV)
 A Hard Look (2000) (TV) (Documentary)
 Way Past Cool (2000) (TV) Score Mixer
 Late Last Night (1999) (TV)
 Kurosawa: The Last Emperor (1999) (Documentary)
 Three Businessmen (1998)
 The Almost Perfect Bank Robbery (1998) (TV)
 Nightmare in Big Sky Country (1998) (TV)
 Since You've Been Gone (1998)
 Standoff (1998)
 Perfect Body (1997) (TV)
 Any Mother's Son (1997) (TV)
 Perversions of Science (1997) TV Series
 The Three Lives of Karen (1997) (TV)
 Pretty Poison (1996) (TV)
 Sweet Dreams (1996) (TV)
 Death and the Compass (1996) (TV)... a.k.a. Muerte y la Brújula, La (Mexico)
 The Winner (1996) (Japanese directors-cut only)
 A Boy Called Hate (1996)
 Her Last Chance (1996) (TV)
 She Fought Alone (1995) (TV) ... a.k.a. Scared by Love
 My Dubious Sex Drive (1995)
 White Mile (1994) (TV)
 Car 54, Where Are You? (1994)
 Floundering (1994)
 Love, Cheat & Steal (1993) (TV)
 Key West (1993) TV Series (13 episodes)
 Roadside Prophets (1992)
 Death and the Compass (1992) (TV) for UK broadcast
 The Linguini Incident (1991) (restaurant source music)
 Zandalee (1991)
 No Secrets (1991)
 Trust Me (1989)
 Tales from the Crypt (1989) TV Series (episode "The Bribe")
 Straight to Hell (1987)
 Sid and Nancy (1986)

Performing Arts and Sound Installation Credits

 Here. Take It (2022) Commissioned score composition, and sound design for Liss Fain Dance. Presented in 8.1 ch sound at Z Space (SF). Choreographer Liss Fain
 Fly Sichuan (2020) Score composition, sound-design for 20.1 channel theatrical "fly ride" sound installation. Tianfu, China Produced by Tippett Studio
 Fly Chongqing (2020) Score composition, sound-design for 20.1 channel theatrical "fly ride" sound installation. Chengdu, China Produced by Tippett Studio
 OUT THERE (2017-2019) Sound-design composition and mix for on-going experimental film by Lucy Raven and Phil Tippett. Preliminary screening at EMPAC (Albany, New York). Premiere screening at MOMA (NY)
 Where Good Souls Fear (2017) Commissioned score composition for Disability Dance Works. Choreographer Alice Sheppard
 Dream of Anhui (2016) Score composition, sound-design and mixer for 20.1 channel theatrical sound installation. Hefei, China Produced by Tippett Studio Director Phil Tippett
 Tacit Consent (dance score) (2016) Commissioned score and sound-design composition for Liss Fain Dance. Presented in 20.1 ch sound at YBCA (SF). Choreographer Liss Fain Co-presentation with Yerba Buena Center for the Arts
 Tacit Consent  (installation) (2016) Visual and sound installation at YBCA (SF) in collaboration with set-designer, Matthew Antaky and sound-installation and projection-designer Frédéric O. Boulay Co-presentation with Yerba Buena Center for the Arts
 Under An Untouchable Sky (2015) Commissioned score composition for Alice Sheppard. Choreographer Alice Sheppard
 A Space Divided (2015) Commissioned score composition, sound and music supervisor for Liss Fain Dance. Presented in 8.1 ch sound at Z Space (SF). Choreographer Liss Fain
 The Imperfect is Our Paradise (2014) Commissioned score composition for Liss Fain Dance. Choreographer Liss Fain
 After The Light (2014) Commissioned score composition for Liss Fain Dance. Presented in 8.1 ch sound at Z Space (SF). Choreographer Liss Fain
 Awkward Beauty (2013) Commissioned score composition for Amy Seiwert's Imagery. Choreographer Marc Brew
 Windshield Perspective (2013) Commissioned score and sound installation for The Architecture and Design Museum (A+D Museum), Los Angeles. Presented in 8.1 ch sound. Curator Greg Goldin
 The Water is Clear and Still (2012/13) Commissioned score composition for Liss Fain Dance. Presented in 10.1 ch sound at Z Space (SF). Choreographer Liss Fain
 Two by 24: Love on Loop (2012) Commissioned score composition for RAWdance. Choreographers Wendy Rein and Ryan T. Smith
 Full of Words (2011) Commissioned score composition for AXIS Dance Company. Choreographer Marc Brew
 Fantasia Mexicana (2011) Sound design and composition for dance-program for The Tea Dancers/Ballet de la Compasión.
 The True & False are One (2010) Commissioned score composition for Liss Fain Dance. Choreographer Liss Fain
 Longplayer (2010) Performer in an excerpt of Longplayer. Composer Jem Finer
 Speak of Familiar Things (2010) Commissioned score composition for Liss Fain Dance. Choreographer Liss Fain
 Afternoon of a Fawn (2010) Sound-design for dance performance by Lisa Bufano and Sonsherée Giles. Choreographer Sonsherée Giles.
 Profound/Refound (2008) Sound-design installation accompanying art exhibition by sculptor and painter Ben Smith

External links
www.prayforrain.com
 
www.danwool.bandcamp.com
Dan Wool's YouTube Channel

American film score composers
American male film score composers
American punk rock musicians
Living people
Musicians from St. Louis
Musicians from San Francisco
American sound designers
Year of birth missing (living people)